Teodors Sukatnieks (born 19 May 1894, died between 1941 and 1944) was a Latvian athlete. He competed in the men's discus throw at the 1924 Summer Olympics. He died during World War II in a Soviet prison camp.

References

External links
 

1894 births
1940s deaths
Year of death missing
Athletes (track and field) at the 1924 Summer Olympics
Latvian male discus throwers
Olympic athletes of Latvia
People who died in the Gulag
Latvian people who died in Soviet detention
Civilians killed in World War II